Sand Lake is a lake in Becker County and Clay County, Minnesota, in the United States.

Sand Lake was named for its sandy lake shore.

See also
List of lakes in Minnesota

References

Lakes of Minnesota
Lakes of Becker County, Minnesota
Lakes of Clay County, Minnesota